The 2018–19 CEV Champions League was the highest level of European club volleyball in the 2018–19 season and the 59th edition.

Qualification

A total of 20 teams participate in the main competition, with 18 teams being allocated direct vacancies on the basis of ranking list for European Cups Competitions and 2 teams qualify from the qualification rounds. Drawing of lots for the pools composition was held on 2 November 2018.

Format
League round
A round-robin format (each team plays every other team in its pool twice, once home and once away) where the 20 participating teams are drawn into 5 pools of 4 teams each.

The standings is determined by the number of matches won.
In case of a tie in the number of matches won by two or more teams, their ranking is based on the following criteria:
result points (points awarded for results: 3 points for 3–0 or 3–1 wins, 2 points for 3–2 win, 1 point for 2–3 loss);
set quotient (the number of total sets won divided by the number of total sets lost);
points quotient (the number of total points scored divided by the number of total points lost);
results of head-to-head matches between the teams in question.

Playoffs
A knockout format where the 8 qualified teams are each draw into the quarter-finals with the round winners advancing to the next rounds (semifinals and final). Matches in the quarter-finals and semifinals consists of two legs (home and away).
Result points are awarded for each leg (3 points for 3–0 or 3–1 wins, 2 points for 3–2 win, 1 point for 2–3 loss). After two legs, the team with the most result points advances further in the tournament. The Golden Set winner is the team that first obtains 15 points, provided that the points difference between the two teams is at least 2 points (thus, the Golden Set is similar to a tiebreak set in a normal match).

Grand finale
A single match between the winners of the semifinals in a neutral venue decides the tournament champion.

Pools composition
Drawing of lots was held on 2 November 2018, the 20 teams are divided in 4 pots of 5 teams each, with one team per pot being draw into each of the 5 pools (A, B, C, D, E).

Draw

League round
The league round started on 20 November 2018.

All times are local.

Pool A

  
  

|}

|}

Pool B

  

|}

|}

Pool C

  

  

|}

|}

Pool D

  

  

|}

|}

Pool E

  

|}

|}

Playoff round
Drawing of lots was held in Luxembourg City, Luxembourg on 1 March 2019.

Quarter-finals

|}

First leg

|}

Second leg

|}

Semifinals

|}

First leg

|}

Second leg

|}

Final

|}

References

External links
Official website

CEV Women's Champions League
CEV Women's Champions League
CEV Women's Champions League